Cloverdale is a community in the Canadian province of Nova Scotia, located in  Colchester County in the Stewiacke Valley.

References
Cloverdale on Destination Nova Scotia

Communities in Colchester County
General Service Areas in Nova Scotia